Seven Golden Men is a 1965 Italian crime-comedy film directed by Marco Vicario. A film about a bank heist, it follows a gang of men and one woman. It followed the same story line as Topkapi, and has a sequel, Seven Golden Men Strike Again.

Plot
The film revolves around an internationally mixed team of high-profile heisters specializing in gold thefts, led by Albert the Professor and his seductive lover Giorgia. Their target is the Swiss National Bank in Geneva, which is hoarding a large amount of gold bullions in their high-security vault; while Albert directs the operation from his hotel room, Giorgia acts as a decoy and provides information from inside the bank with hidden cameras, a homing device placed inside the vault, and explanations gleamed from the bank's manager. The other six men - Adolf, August, Aldo, Anthony, Alfonso and Alfred - posing as sanitation workers and equipped with a truckload of gadgets, enter the sewer system right beneath the bank. Avoiding the intricate security system, they drill into the vault, right into the underside of the bullion stack, and steal six tons of gold while leaving the outermost layer intact to conceal their heist.

While the plan is perfectly executed, it hits several snags. A radio ham intercepts their transmissions and informs the police, but Interpol, who is on the team's trail, dismisses the case after a superficial check in the vault. Giorgia wandering around the hotel suite with insufficient clothing nearly brings the police down on Albert for disorderly conduct, but Giorgia charms the policeman away. In the end, the whole team gets away unscathed. After declaring the whole load a delivery of brass for a foundry in Naples, they split into two groups, with Albert and Giorgia travelling by train while the others go across the border by car. However, Albert is in no mind to share the spoils, and his six companions are detained for possessing forged passports. But in turn, Albert is betrayed by Giorgia, who has begun an affair with the bank manager and devised a plan to steal all the gold for their own.

However, when Giorgia and her new lover attempt to intercept the cargo, they learn to their horror that it has been transported far quicker than anticipated, and has already been melted down; disappointed, the bank manager leaves Giorgia behind. But Albert has actually tricked them and diverted the gold cargo to Rome. There he reunites with Giorgia; but their ex-associates, who have been released in the meantime, trail them to the place where Albert has hidden the truck with the gold. The chase ends in front of the Colosseum, where the six intercept the transport; but August accidentally disengages the handbrakes, causing the truck to roll into the open and crash, spilling the bullions to the feet of a crowd of greedy pedestrians. With their plan ultimately foiled, the Golden Men grudgingly reunite and prepare a new heist on the Commercial Bank of Italy.

Cast
 Philippe Leroy: Albert the Professor, a Brit
 Rossana Podestà: Giorgia
 Gastone Moschin: Adolf, a German
 Giampiero Albertini: August, a Portuguese
 Gabriele Tinti: Aldo, an Italian
 Dario De Grassi: Anthony, an Irishman
 Manuel Zarzo: Alfonso, a Spaniard
 Maurice Poli: Alfred, a Frenchman
 Ennio Balbo: Police Chief
 Alberto Bonucci: Radio Ham
 José Suárez: Bank Manager

External links
 
 http://www.mymovies.it/dizionario/recensione.asp?id=22559

1965 films
1960s Italian-language films
Films directed by Marco Vicario
Films scored by Armando Trovajoli
Italian heist films
Italian crime comedy films
1960s crime comedy films
1960s heist films
1965 comedy films
1960s Italian films